Badar is a surname of Central Asian origin. People with this surname include:

Shahin Badar (born 1974), an English singer-songwriter
Saleem Badar (born 1953) is a Pakistani former cricket umpire
Mullah Badar, governor of the Afghan province of Badghis during the reign of the Taliban
Saif Badar (born 1998), a Pakistani cricketer
Asma Badar (born 1988), an Indian actress
Rich Badar (born 1943), a former professional American football quarterback
Taseer Badar (born 1973), a Pakistani-born American entrepreneur, businessman and philanthropist